The women's canoe slalom K-1 competition at the 2016 Olympic Games in Rio de Janeiro took place between 7 and 11 August at the Olympic Whitewater Stadium.

The gold medal was won by Maialen Chourraut of Spain.

Schedule 
All times are Brasília Time (UTC−3).

Results

References

Women's slalom K-1
2016 in women's canoeing
Women's events at the 2016 Summer Olympics